Edward III of England (1312–1377) was King of England from 1327 until his death.

Edward III may also refer to:
Edward III, Duke of Bar (1377–1415), who fought and died at the Battle of Agincourt during the Hundred Years' War
Edward III (play), a play thought to be partly by William Shakespeare
Edward the Confessor (c. 1004–1066), third King Edward of Anglo-Saxon England